Miss Earth 2001 is the first Miss Earth pageant, organized by Carousel Productions. The pageant coronation night was held on October 28, 2001 at the University of the Philippines Theater in Quezon City, Philippines. There were 42 delegates who competed in the pageant that focuses on environmental issues. Catharina Svensson of Denmark, a professional equestrienne, fashion model, and third year law student, was crowned as the pageant's first winner.

Miss Earth was formally launched in a press conference on April 3, 2001 along with the search of Miss Philippines to represent Philippines in the international competition. Likewise, the pageant tied up with the Philippine government agencies such as the Philippine Department of Tourism (DoT), Department of Environment and Natural Resources (DENR), the Metropolitan Manila Development Authority (MMDA), and at least two international environmental groups such as the United Nations Environment Programme (UNEP) and the American Global Release to further its environmental advocacy.

Results

Placements

Special awards

Order of announcements

Top 10

Top 4

Winning answer
Final Question in Miss Earth 2001: "Technology makes life very convenient but it is also being blamed for certain environmental problems. How do you propose to find a balance between technology and Earth preservation?"
 
Answer of Miss Earth 2001: "Well, of course technology does make a lot of problems for us in the environment. But we can do something to make it better. For example in Denmark, we do a lot of farming and we use a lot of technology to make it easier for us. But that also means that we use a lot of chemicals that spread and go down to a ground water and makes the ground water worse. So what we can do and what we are doing at the moment is to try to make a regulations on what chemicals are allowed to be used and also thereby make controls of it so we can use those chemicals less." - Catharina Svensson, represented Denmark.

Preliminary events
Thirty five of the forty two delegates of Miss Earth 2001 were presented to the media on October 11, 2001 at the poolside of the Hotel Intercontinental Manila in Makati, Metro Manila.

Contestants
List of countries and delegates that participated in Miss Earth 2001:

  - Daniela Stucan
  - Christy Anderson
  - Catherine Villarroel
  - Simone Régis
  - Michelle Carrie Lillian Weswaldi
  - Natalia Botero Argote
  - Ivana Galesic
  - Catharina Svensson
  - Catherine Núñez
  - Grace Marie Zabaneh Menéndez
  - Evelyn Mikomägi
  - Nardos Tiluhan Wondemu
  - Martina Aitolehti
  - Charlene Ann Figueras
  - Carmina Elizabeth Paz Hernández
  - Krisztina Kovacs
  - Shamita Singha
  - Monica Rosetti
  - Misuzu Hirayama
  - Margarita Kravtsova
  - Aqua Bonsu
  - Jelena Keirane
  - Adelle Raymond Boustany
  - Joey Tan Eng Li
  - Jamie-Lee Huisman
  - Abbey Flynn
  - Karla José Leclair Monzón
  - Aliana Khan
  - Paola Barreda Benavides
  - Carlene Aguilar
  - Amaricelys Reyes Guzmán
  - Victoria Bonya
  - Calista Ng Poh Li
  - Inecke van der Westhuizen
  - Noemi Caldas Ortiz
  - Hsiu Chao-Yun
  - Hilda Bukozo
  - Victoria Wachholz
  - Gozde Bahadir
  - Abigail Royce
  - Lirigmel Ramos
  - Sheena Nanty

Notes

Withdrawals
  - Janil Bird
  - Caroline Costerman

References

External links
 
 Miss Earth Foundation
 Miss Earth Foundation Kids' I Love My Planet

2001
2001 in the Philippines
2001 beauty pageants
Beauty pageants in the Philippines